Emily Huelskamp (born January 17, 1987) is an American rower. In the 2013 World Rowing Championships, she won a gold medal in the women's coxless four event.

References

External links

1987 births
American female rowers
World Rowing Championships medalists for the United States
Living people
Pan American Games medalists in rowing
Pan American Games gold medalists for the United States
Rowers at the 2015 Pan American Games
Medalists at the 2015 Pan American Games
21st-century American women